The Oak is a 1992 Romanian drama film co-written and directed by Lucian Pintilie. It was screened out of competition at the 1992 Cannes Film Festival.

Cast
 Maia Morgenstern as Nela
 Răzvan Vasilescu as Mitică
 Victor Rebengiuc as Village mayor
 Dorel Vișan as Country Priest
 Ion Pavlescu as Doctor Gîlcescu
  as Priest's wife
 Gheorghe Visu as Priest in the train
 Dan Condurache as Prosecutor
  as Nela's father
  as Butușină
 Leopoldina Bălănuță as Nela's mother
  as Mitică's assistant
 Ionel Mihăilescu as Titi

References

External links
 

1992 films
1990s Romanian-language films
1992 drama films
Films directed by Lucian Pintilie
Romanian drama films